Linear production game (LP Game) is a N-person game in which the value of a coalition can be obtained by solving a linear programming problem. It is widely used in the context of resource allocation and payoff distribution. Mathematically, there are m types of resources and n products can be produced out of them. Product j requires  amount of the kth resource. The products can be sold at a given market price  while the resources themselves can not. Each of the N players is given a vector  of resources. The value of a coalition S is the maximum profit it can achieve with all the resources possessed by its members. It can be obtained by solving a corresponding linear programming problem  as follows.

Core 

Every LP game v is a totally balanced game. So every subgame of v has a non-empty core. It can be proved by the duality theorems that  is in the core of v.

An important interpretation of the imputation  is that under the current market, the value of each resource j is exactly , although it is not valued in themselves. So the payoff one player i should receive is the total value of the resources he possesses.

However, not all the imputations in the core can be obtained from the optimal dual solutions. There are a lot of discussions on this problem. One of the mostly widely used method is to consider the r-fold replication of the original problem. It can be shown that if an imputation u is in the core of the r-fold replicated game for all r, then u can be obtained from the optimal dual solution.

References 

 

Cooperative games